The National Youth Assembly of the Republic of Korea (Youth Assembly) is the main national youth parliament under supervisions by the National Assembly of Korea and with authorities to introduce legislation directly to full sessions and committees of the National Assembly. This National Youth Assembly has a chairperson and members of the Assembly whom to be elected by registered voters between 13 and 25 ages.

External links
 The National Youth Assembly of the Republic of Korea main webpage, July 13, 2013 (HTML)

Youth councils